The 1935 World Table Tennis Championships women's singles was the ninth edition of the women's singles championship.
Marie Kettnerová defeated Magda Gál in the final by three sets to one, to win the title.

Results

See also
List of World Table Tennis Championships medalists

References

-
-